Charley Pride in Person is a live album by country music artist Charley Pride. It was recorded at Panther Hall in Fort Worth, Texas, and released on the RCA Victor label (catalog no. LSP-4094). The album was awarded four stars from the web site AllMusic. It debuted on Billboard magazine's country album chart on February 8, 1969, peaked at No. 2, and remained on the chart for 34 weeks.

Track listing
Side A
 "Intro By Bo Powell" [0:30]
 "The Last Thing On My Mind" (Tom Paxton) [2:00]
 "Just Between You and Me" (Jack Clement) [2:03]
 "I Know One" (Jack Clement) [2:08]
 "Dialogue" [2:14]
 "Lovesick Blues" (Cliff Friend, Irving Mills) [2:45]
 "The Image of Me" (Wayne Kemp) [2:48]
 "Kaw-Liga" (Fred Rose, Hank Williams) [3:00]

Side B
 "Shutters and Boards" (Audie Murphy, Scott Turner) [2:09]
 "Six Days On the Road" (Carl Montgomery, Earl Green) [2:30]
 "Streets of Baltimore" (Harlan Howard, Tompall Glaser) [2:15]
 "Got Leavin' On Her Mind" (Jack Clement) [2:11]
 "Crystal Chandeliers" (Ted Harris) [2:35]
 "Cotton Fields" (Huddie Ledbetter) [2:05]

See also
 Charley Pride discography

References

1969 albums
Charley Pride albums
albums produced by Felton Jarvis
albums produced by Jack Clement
RCA Records albums